Aenetus is a genus of moths of the family Hepialidae. There are 24 described species found in Indonesia, New Guinea, New Caledonia, Australia and New Zealand. Most species have green or blue forewings and reddish hindwings, but some are predominantly brown or white. The larvae feed in the trunks of living trees, burrowing horizontally into the trunk, then vertically down.

Species 
 Aenetus arfaki (New Guinea)
 Aenetus astathes (Western Australia)
Aenetus bilineatus (New Guinea) 
Aenetus blackburnii - Blackburn's ghost moth (South Australia; Victoria, Australia) 
 Aenetus cohici (New Caledonia) 
 Aenetus crameri (New Guinea)
 Aenetus dulcis (Western Australia) 
Food plant: Agonis
Aenetus djernaesae (Western Australia ) 
Aenetus edwardsi (Queensland, Australia) 
Aenetus eugyna (New Guinea)
Aenetus eximia - common ghost moth (southern Queensland to Victoria, Australia) 
Recorded food plants: Daphnandra, Dodonaea, Doryphora, Eucalyptus, Glochidion, Nothofagus, Prostanthera, Waterhousea
 Aenetus hampsoni (New Guinea)
 Aenetus lewinii (southern Queensland to New South Wales, Australia)
Recorded food plants: Casuarina, Leptospermum
 Aenetus ligniveren - common splendid ghost moth (Southern Queensland to South Australia) 
Recorded food plants: Acacia, Acmena, Callistemon, Dodonaea, Eucalyptus, Lantana, Leptospermum, Lophostemon, Malus, Melaleuca, Olearia, Pomaderris, Prostanthera, Rubus
 Aenetus marginatus (New Guinea)
 Aenetus mirabilis - North Queensland swift moth (Queensland) 
Food plant: Alphitonia
 Aenetus montanus (Victoria and New South Wales, Australia) 
Food plant: Eucalyptus
 Aenetus ombraloma (Tasmania)
Food plant: Eucalyptus
 Aenetus ramsayi (Queensland and New South Wales) 
Recorded food plants: Diploglottis, Eucalyptus
 Aenetus scotti (Queensland and New South Wales, Australia) 
Recorded food plants: Daphnandra, Dendrocnide, Diploglottis, Eucalyptus, Lantana, Tetradium
 Aenetus scripta (Western Australia) 
 Aenetus sordida (New Guinea)
 Aenetus splendens (southern Queensland and New South Wales Australia) 
Recorded food plants: Callicoma, Casuarina, Eugenia, Trema
Aenetus sumatraensis (Sumatra, Indonesia) 
Aenetus tegulatus (Indonesia, New Guinea) 
Aenetus tephroptilus (Western Australia)
Aenetus thermistis (northern Australia) 
Aenetus tindalei (South Australia) 
 Aenetus toxopeusi (New Guinea)
 Aenetus virescens - puriri moth (North Island, New Zealand)  (New Zealand's largest native moth)
Recorded food plants: Carpodetus, Citrus, Cornus, Eucalyptus, Malus, Nothofagus, oak, Prunus, willow

References

External links
 Hepialidae of Australia
 Hepialidae: Aenetus, johngrehan.net

Hepialidae
Exoporia genera
Taxa named by Gottlieb August Wilhelm Herrich-Schäffer